Sir George Burrard, 4th Baronet (13 October 1805 – 7 September 1870) was a British politician.

He was the only son of Sir George Burrard, 3rd Baronet and his first wife Elizabeth Anne Coppell, daughter of William Coppell. In 1856, he succeeded his father as baronet. Burrard was Member of Parliament (MP) for Lymington from 1828 to 1832.

On 3 January 1830, he married Isabella Duckett, only daughter of Sir George Duckett, 2nd Baronet. Their marriage was childless. Burrard drowned, aged 65, while bathing in Lyme Regis and was succeeded in the baronetcy by his younger half-brother Harry.

References

External links 
 

1805 births
1870 deaths
Baronets in the Baronetage of Great Britain
Members of the Parliament of the United Kingdom for Lymington
UK MPs 1826–1830
UK MPs 1830–1831
UK MPs 1831–1832